, prov. designation: , is a trans-Neptunian object and binary system from the classical Kuiper belt, located in the outermost region of the Solar System. It was first observed at Mauna Kea Observatory on 18 July 1999. Discovered in 2005, its minor-planet moon is just 3 kilometers smaller than its primary and has an orbital period of 84 days.

Orbit and classification 

 orbit characterizes it as a classical Kuiper Belt object, or cubewano. Due to its nearly circular orbit and low inclination, it is also in the "cold" population of cubewanos. As a result, it is likely reddish in color.

Satellite 

 has one moon, S/2005 1. This moon was discovered by the Hubble Space Telescope on 5 October 2013. It orbits 3,267 kilometres away from 1999 OJ4, completing one orbit every 84.115 days. From the surface of 1999 OJ4, S/2005 (1999 OJ4) 1 would have an apparent diameter of roughly 8.11°, over fourteen times the apparent size of the Sun from Earth.

Notes

References

External links 
 1999 OJ4 – System parameters, Lowell Observatory
 List of Transneptunian Objects, Minor Planet Center
 List of binary asteroids/TNOs, Johnston's Archive
 Asteroid Lightcurve Database (LCDB), query form (info )
 
 

612095
612095
612095
19990718